Veefkind is an unincorporated community located in the town of Sherman, Clark County, Wisconsin, United States.
Veefkind—of which few traces now remain—was located on the now-abandoned Greenwood branch of the Soo Line. The community was named for Henry B. Veefkind, who owned a general store and had convinced the Wisconsin Central Railroad to build a line through the area.

Notes

Unincorporated communities in Clark County, Wisconsin
Unincorporated communities in Wisconsin